Stefan Joos (born 3 April 1963) is a Belgian fencer. He competed at the 1984 and 1988 Summer Olympics. His brother, Peter Joos, also fenced for Belgium at the 1984 Games.

References

External links
 

1963 births
Living people
Belgian male fencers
Belgian épée fencers
Belgian foil fencers
Olympic fencers of Belgium
Fencers at the 1984 Summer Olympics
Fencers at the 1988 Summer Olympics
People from Uccle
Sportspeople from Brussels